Daphne myrtilloides is a shrub, of the family Thymelaeaceae.  It is native to China, specifically Gansu, Shaanxi, and Shanxi.

Description
The shrub is deciduous and grows from 10 to 30 cm tall. Its branches are yellowish-green and slender. It is often found in open subalpine forests and stony fields.

References

myrtilloides